Kemper is an unincorporated community in Dillon County, South Carolina, United States. It is located along South Carolina Highway 41 southwest of Lake View, South Carolina, and northeast of Fork, South Carolina.

External links
Kemper

Unincorporated communities in South Carolina
Unincorporated communities in Dillon County, South Carolina